Radio Isla is a radio station located in Pichilemu. It is owned by Sociedad Comercial e Inversiones Fivalen Ltda. and directed by Fidel Valenzuela González.

References

External links 

 Radio Isla

Radio stations in Chile
Mass media in Pichilemu
Organizations based in Pichilemu
Organizations established in 2006
2006 establishments in Chile